The SH4 highway is a national highway in Albania spanning  across the counties of Durrës, Fier, Gjirokastër and Tirana. As it connects the country's second largest city Durrës to Greece, the highway represents a significant north–south transportation corridor in Albania and an essential part of the Adriatic–Ionian motorway and Pan-European Corridor VIII.

Description 

The Rruga Shtetërore 4 (SH4) constitutes the southern section of the north–south transportation corridor in Albania. It connects the country's second largest city of Durrës on the Adriatic Sea to the country of Greece at the Kakavijë border crossing. Part of the road network of Albania, the highway is a portion of the European route E853 Kakavijë–Ioannina, and the Pan-European Corridor VIII Durrës–Skopje–Sofia–Varna. Combined with the Rruga Shtetërore 1 (SH1), the northern section of the north–south corridor, the highway will form a major segment of the proposed Adriatic–Ionian motorway.

Route 

The Rruga Shtetërore 4 (SH4) consists of two traffic lanes and an emergency lane in each driving direction separated by a central reservation along most of its length. There are a number of rest areas along the highway providing various types of services, ranging from simple parking spaces to filling stations. The highway spans  between the city of Durrës in Durrës County across Rrogozhinë in Tirana County, Fier in Fier County, Tepelenë in Gjirokastër County and the Kakavia border crossing to Greece.

See also 
 International E-road network
 Transport in Albania
 A2 (Albania)

References

External links 

SH04 (Albania)
Transport in Durrës County
Transport in Fier County
Transport in Gjirokastër County
Transport in Tirana County
Pan-European Corridor VIII